Kelly Griffin (born November 7, 1986) is an American rugby sevens player and Olympian. As a member of the United States women's national rugby sevens team, she won a bronze medal at the 2013 Rugby World Cup Sevens, and a silver medal at the 2015 Pan American Games. She was also captain of the United States Women's Rugby Sevens team for the 2016 Summer Olympics in Rio de Janeiro, Brazil.

Early life and high school 
Kelly Griffin was born and raised in Berkeley, California and played soccer and basketball starting at the age of 6. She attended Berkeley High School in Berkeley, California, where she played basketball for coach Gene Nakamura, who called Griffin's 2003 team the group he was "most fond of" from his 24 seasons as head coach.

Collegiate rugby 
Griffin moved from Berkeley to Los Angeles to attend UCLA in 2004, and her freshman she year joined the UCLA Women's Club Rugby team, known as the UCLA Bruin Rangers. She helped lead UCLA to several national playoff appearances, and was named a USA Rugby AIG Women’s Collegiate All-American in 2007 and 2008. Additionally she was selected for the USA Rugby Under-23 team in 2006 and 2007.

Women's Premier League 
After graduating from UCLA with an applied math degree in 2008, Griffin returned to the San Francisco Bay Area and joined the Berkeley All Blues Women's Rugby Club. During the 2011 season of the Women's Premier League, Griffin won the 7s National Championship with the All Blues and was named tournament Most Valued Player. The All Blues  also won the 2011 Women's Premier League Championship, with Griffin leading the league in tries scored. Additionally, Griffin won the 2011 Women's All-Star National Championship with Pacific Coast team, rounding out her three championships in a six-month period.

USA Rugby Eagles Women's Sevens 
In early 2012, Griffin signed a full-time training contract with USA Rugby, and along with 7 other women, became the first professional female rugby players in the United States. Griffin moved to Chula Vista, California to train at the Olympic Training Center with the rest of the contracted 7s players. From 2011/2012 on, Griffin has played in the World Rugby Women's Sevens Series, captaining the USA team for several tournaments. Additionally, going into the 2016 Summer Olympics, Griffin leads the country in appearances on the World Sevens Series Circuit, and is the only athlete of the "original eight" to have remained in residency throughout the four-year lead up to the 2016 Olympics.

In addition to the World Rugby Women's Sevens Series, Griffin competed with the USA Eagles Sevens at the 2013 Rugby World Cup Sevens. After an undefeated campaign in pool play, the USA went on to claim the bronze medal by beating Spain in sudden death overtime 10-5 in the 3rd place match.

In June 2015, Griffin was selected as captain of the USA Women's Sevens team for the North American and Caribbean Rugby Association Championship, which also served as an Olympic qualifying tournament. The USA would win the NACRA gold medal, and also qualify for the 2016 Rio Summer Olympicss by beating Mexico in the Championship game, 88-0 .

In July 2015, Griffin competed as part of Team USA at the 2015 Pan American Games in Toronto. The United States women's 7s team lost to Canada in the gold medal match, leaving the tournament with silver.

On July 18, 2016, Griffin was named as captain of the USA Women's Olympic Rugby Team, which competed in the 2016 Rio Summer Olympics, the inaugural Olympiad to include women's rugby.

Competitive History with the USA Eagles Women's Sevens

World Rugby Women's Sevens Series 

 2011/2012 IRB Women's Sevens Challenge Cup (Precursor to the Women's Sevens Series)
 2012/2013 World Rugby Women's Sevens Series (USA: Finished 4th)
 2013/2014 World Rugby Women's Sevens Series (USA: Finished 7th)
 2014/2015  World Rugby Women's Sevens Series (USA: Finished 5th)
 2015/2016  World Rugby Women's Sevens Series (USA: Finished 6th)

Rugby World Cup Sevens 

 2013 Rugby World Cup Sevens (USA: Bronze Medal)

NACRA Women's Sevens Championship 

 2015 NACRA Championship, 2016 Olympic Qualifying Event (USA: Gold Medal)

Pan America Games 

 2015 Pan American Games (USA: Silver Medal)

Olympic Games 

 2016 Summer Olympics (USA: 5th)

References

External links
 Kelly Griffin at USA Rugby
 
 
 
 

1986 births
Living people
United States international rugby sevens players
American female rugby union players
American female rugby sevens players
Female rugby sevens players
Olympic rugby sevens players of the United States
Rugby sevens players at the 2016 Summer Olympics
Pan American Games silver medalists for the United States
Pan American Games medalists in rugby sevens
Rugby sevens players at the 2015 Pan American Games
UCLA Bruins athletes
University of California, Los Angeles alumni
Medalists at the 2015 Pan American Games
21st-century American women